Battlefield is the second studio album by American singer Jordin Sparks, first released on July 17, 2009 through Jive Records and 19 Recordings. The album debuted at number 7 in the United States, number 11 in the UK, number 34 in Australia and top 20 in many territories.

Contributions to the album's production came from a variety of producers, including Harvey Mason, Jr., Claude Kelly, Ryan Tedder, Dr. Luke and Lucas Secon. The title track was released as the lead single from the album in May 2009, peaking at number 10 on the Billboard Hot 100 chart in the United States. "S.O.S. (Let the Music Play)" (which contains a sample from Shannon's 1983 single "Let the Music Play") was released as the second single from Battlefield in August 2009, followed by "Don't Let It Go to Your Head" (a cover version of Fefe Dobson's song of the same name) as the third single in January 2010. Upon its release, Battlefield received mixed reviews from music critics, most of whom complimented the production and Sparks' vocal performance, but criticized its lack of originality in terms of pop music. The album sold over 600,000 copies worldwide.

Background and production 
Sparks confirmed in several interviews that the album would take the themes from the first single, "Battlefield". Then it was announced through the official press release that the album would be named Battlefield, after the first single, because it was central to the themes and other recordings for the album. Speaking of the lead song, Sparks said 

Sparks spoke to Billboard magazine about how the recording process was much different to that of her previous album. Her debut had been recorded in approximately 20 days due to the huge appetite that fans had for her music. On the new album Sparks took her time meaning that not only could she write some of the songs but also had time to make the sound more mature or reject records which she felt unhappy with. Writing for the album began in the middle of 2008.

Music 
On May 18, 2009 it was revealed so far Sparks had recorded 30 songs for the album but would select songs that fit well with the first single "Battlefield" since that was now also the name for the album. Later in May during an interview with Digital Spy, Sparks revealed that she has been involved in writing songs for the album, in total contributing to about 12 of approximately 30 recorded songs. She also revealed that although the album had at that time produced no duets she was hopeful to collaborate with Leona Lewis for a powerful ballad. When asked who else she would like to collaborate with she said Fergie, Justin Timberlake, and Alicia Keys.

None of these collaborations materialized although Sparks did confirm in an interview that she had made a pact to record a duet with Lewis for her future album as she believes the duo could be the next "Whitney Houston and Mariah Carey". The reason cited for no duets on this album was a lack of time and tight deadlines. As mentioned previously there are no vocal guests on the album although Tedder can be heard single backing vocals and ad-libs on the album's title song "Battlefield". Originally the album was intended to feature one guest in the form of T-Pain who had produced and appeared on the song "Watch You Go" with his signature vocoder (singing autotune), but for unspecified reasons this version of the song was omitted and replaced with a solo version featuring just Spark's vocals. Furthermore, of the 12 songs she has penned four have made the final version of the album ("Emergency (911)", "Was I the Only One", "Faith" and "The Cure") whilst a further two are being used as promotional songs (bonus tracks "Vertigo" and "Papercut"). All together between 30 and 40 songs had been short-listed for inclusion in the album, from which the final track list was selected and mastered.

Release and promotion 
 July 20 – Good Morning America
 July 21 – Live with Regis and Kelly, Entertainment Tonight, Late Night with Jimmy Fallon
 July 22 – interviewed on The Today Show
 July 23 – interviewed on It's On with Alexa Chung
 July 24 – The Wendy Williams Show
 August 9 – appearance at the Teen Choice Awards
 August 17 – Live with Regis and Kelly
 September 17 – VH1 Divas
 October 13 – Performance of "S.O.S. (Let the Music Play)" on The Paul O'Grady Show in the UK.

The album was first announced to be released on July 14, 2009 in America by Sparks herself through Twitter and by Amazon.com. However it was then later confirmed through the official press release from Jive Records that the album would in fact be released a week later instead on July 21, 2009.

On May 10, Sparks went ahead with a planned photo shoot for the album's cover and future singles. A picture from the photo shoot was released in the aforementioned press release which shows Sparks wearing a partially buttoned denim jacket over a white dress, seen leaning against a big fan with stage lights shining through.

Sparks released a two disc deluxe edition featuring two bonus tracks at the same time as the standard edition, following in the footsteps of fellow label-mates Ciara and Britney Spears. In international markets, "Tattoo" and "One Step at a Time" from her debut album were included as bonus tracks to help promote the album; both songs were successful in their own rights, reaching top 20 in Japan, the UK and Australia with no promotion.

Singles 
 "Battlefield" is the first single from the album peaking at number ten on the US Billboard Hot 100 and number five on the Canadian Hot 100. Internationally the song reached number three on the New Zealand Singles Chart, number four on the Australian Singles Chart, nine in Ireland, and eleven in the UK.
 "S.O.S. (Let the Music Play)" was confirmed to be lined up as the second single by Jordin Sparks on a radio interview with New York's Fresh 102.7. The song was released in Australia on September 4, 2009 and in the US on September 29, 2009. It was released in the UK on October 12, 2009. The video was shot in Los Angeles, California on August 10, 2009, with Chris Robinson serving as the director. He also worked with Sparks on the "No Air" music video.
 "Don't Let It Go to Your Head" is the third and final single to be released from the album.  It was released as a digital download on January 8, 2010 in the UK only. It was released as a digital download with "Landmines (Main Version)" as the B-side.

Tour 

On March 15, 2010 it was announced that Sparks was going on her first headlining tour, the Battlefield Tour in support of her second studio album of the same name. The tour kicked off on May 1, 2010 in Uncasville, Connecticut and saw Sparks performing at 39 intimate venues across the US such as theaters, ballrooms, amusement parks, and casinos. The tour ended on July 18, 2010 in Philadelphia, Pennsylvania.

Reception

Commercial performance 
The album debuted at number 7 on the US Billboard 200, selling 48,000 copies in its first week. It charted three spots higher, but also with lower sales than her debut album. As of July 2015, the album had sold 190,000 copies in the United States. The album has sold over 600,000 copies worldwide by September 2010.

Critical response 
Upon its release, Battlefield received generally mixed reviews from most music critics, based on an aggregate score of 63/100 from Metacritic.

The Guardian writes "The 2007 hit 'No Air' gave you the breathy, cleancut gist; this second album employs the same tricks - almost literally, in the case of 'Let It Rain', which has a tremulous build-up and heroic chorus ("Let it rain, wash me clean," she commands). Squelchy electronics and a relatively earthy lyric ("Look in her eyes, she's mentally undressing him") give 'S.O.S.' an urban hue, and the clattering 'Let It Rain' is modern R&B worthy of Rihanna. Regrettably, though, Sparks sounds more comfortable with power ballads such as 'No Parade'; and there's an inner Pat Benatar struggling to get out on the title track. OK if you like this kind of thing."

Slant Magazine writes "Sparks is a pop artist and makes no bones about it here. Much of the album's running time is filled with the kind of soggy adult contemporary pulp that weighed down both the singer's self-titled debut and Leona Lewis's Spirit, and the addition of two paper-themed bonus tracks, "Papercut" and "Postcard," on the deluxe version of Battlefield doesn't help matters. One wonders if it would have been a smarter move in terms of career longevity to try to build on the urban audience she started to cultivate with 'No Air'."

Entertainment Weekly said "Battlefield certainly delivers on the artistic end: It's packed with more hooks than a  fisherman's tackle box, none better than on the gorgeous title track, which sports a soaring chorus. Resistance is futile when Sparks, showing heretofore unseen vocal dexterity, takes to the dance floor to ward off a vixen who's barking up the wrong boyfriend. There is actually enough  potential hits to keep the singer in heavy  rotation until well into Idol's 10th season."

Digital Spy also gave the album a generally mixed review, writing, "Nothing here is as irresistible as the single, a brilliant update of the '80s arena rock sound that deserves better than its middling chart performance, but several tracks aren't too far off. 'Don't Let It Go To Your Head' [and] 'Let It Rain'... offers lots of soft rock bombast." However, the reviewer also criticized the album for "sentimental mush in its final stretch, with Sparks delivering a series of threadbare clichés over dull, dated arrangements...The result is an album that improves upon Sparks' debut – it doesn't try so hard to cover all of the bases, and Sparks sounds more comfortable on the uptempo cuts – but has the same Achilles heel: a paucity of really memorable songs. Then again, faced with some tough choices and release date approaching, it's hard to blame Sparks – still only 19, lest we forget - for sticking a little too closely to the middle of the road."

Track listing

Notes
 denotes a vocal producer
"SOS (Let the Music Play)" samples "Let the Music Play", as written by Ed Chisolm and Chris Barbosaby, performed by Shannon

Personnel 
Credits for Battlefield adapted from Allmusic.

 Mark Alloway - mixing assistant
 "Ammo" - Producer
 Dameon Aranda - background vocals
 Louis Biancaniello - background vocals, keyboards, mixing, producer, recording
 Michael Biancaniello - guitar
 Jeff Bova - strings arrangement
 David Boyd  - recording assistant
 Chris Carmichael - strings
 Scott Cutler - producer, recording
 Michael Daley - mixing assistant
 Eric Darken - percussion
 Toby Gad -  engineer, instruments, arrangement, mixing, producer
 Serban Ghenea - mixing
 Aniela Gottwald - assistant engineer
 Lukasz "Dr. Luke" Gottwald - producer
 John Hanes - mixing engineer
 Mich "Cutfather" Hansen - music, percussion, producer
 Greg Hagan - guitar
 Dabling Harward - recording
 Keeley Hawkes - backing vocals, music
 Andrew Hey - guitar, recording
 Pete Hofman - mixing, editor, recording
 Sam Holland - engineer
 Ghazi Hourani - recording assistant
 Claude Kelly - vocal producer

 David Kopatz - music, producer
 Jay Henchman - assistant engineer
 Lasse "Pilfinger" Kramhøft - keyboards, music, producer
 Benjamin "Benny Blanco" Levin - producer
 Dave Lopez - editor, recording
 Manny Marroquin - mixing
 Harvey Mason, Jr. - mixed, music, producer
 Donald "Don E" McLean - bass, keyboards
 Sam Mizell - producer, programming, recording
 Carsten "Mintman" Mortensen - Guitar - Drums - Keyboards - Bass Guitar - Arranger
 Faheem "T-Pain" Najm - producer
 Scott Naughton - engineer, recording
 Mike Payne - guitar
 Christian Plata - mixing assistant
 Tim Roberts - mixing engineer (assistant), assistant engineer
 Lucas Secon - mixing, instruments, producer, programming, arrangement, recording
 Jeremy Shaw - instruments
 Adam B Smith - programming
 Ryan Tedder - background vocals, bass, guitar, keyboards, producer
 Dapo Torimiro - guitars, programming, keyboards, producer, recording
 Javier Valverde - engineer
 Sam Watters - mixing, producers, recording
 Billy Whittington - vocal recording
 Wayne Wilkins - keyboards, producer
 Emily Wright - vocal editor, engineer
 Noel Zancanella, - recording

Charts and certifications

Weekly charts

Certifications

Release history

References 

2009 albums
Albums produced by Benny Blanco
Albums produced by Cutfather
Albums produced by Dr. Luke
Albums produced by Ryan Tedder
Albums produced by Sam Watters
Albums produced by Toby Gad
Jive Records albums
Jordin Sparks albums
19 Recordings albums